Steinbrenner may refer to:

Steinbrenner (surname)
George M. Steinbrenner Field, baseball stadium in Tampa, Florida, U.S.
Steinbrenner High School, Lutz, Florida, U.S.

See also